Octagon is the global sports and entertainment content marketing arm of the Interpublic Group of Companies. In 2017, Octagon moved their global headquarters to 290 Harbor Drive in Stamford, Connecticut.

History
Octagon was founded on April 1, 1983 as Advantage International with its headquarters in Washington, DC. It has been owned by Interpublic since 1997 and has operated under the Octagon brand name since 1999.   

In 1970 Donald Dell, Frank Craighill, Lee Fentress and Ray Benton founded the Washington, D.C. law firm, Dell, Craighill, Fentress & Benton. 

Craighill became Managing Director in the 1990s. In 1997, Interpublic group completed the merger of Advantage and other agencies to form Octagon, overseeing athletes from Steffi Graf of WTA to Moses Malone of the NBA.

IPG
In 1970 Sir Frank Lowe was the head of the advertising agency Collett Dickenson Pearce (CDP).

After leaving CDP in 1981 to form his own agency, Lowe Howard-Spink, which eventually became Lowe & Partners Worldwide, he sold his agency to Interpublic Group (IPG) and joined the board of the US Giant. In 1997, Sir Lowe convinced the IPG board to build a marketing-led sports agency. To do this, IPG bought a group of sports agencies which included APA and Advantage International.

Recent years
Octagon currently operates with over 1,000 employees and 50 offices globally and manages upwards of 13,400 events per year.

On April 5, 2021, John Shea was named CEO of Octagon Sports & Entertainment Network (OSEN). Former CEO Rick Dudley continues to serve as Chairman.

In March 2023, it was announced that Camille Buxeda was named the directors of women's basketball for Octagon. Buxeda's position includes to lead the division, oversee signings and marketing strategies for the company's work with Women's National Basketball Association and Collegiate Athletic Association clients.

References 

Sports management companies
Sports event promotion companies
Entertainment companies of the United States
Companies based in Stamford, Connecticut